Ivan Muliarchuk (born on July 27, 1930, in Ostrożhtsia – died on May 18, 2020, in Ternopil) was a Ukrainian sculptor and member of the Union of Artists of Ukraine (1988).

Biography 
The talent for drawing was manifested in childhood.

He graduated from the Secondary School in Ostrog and the Lutsk Art School (1952), the Faculty of Art and Graphics in Krasnodar, Pedagogical Institute (1967). He worked as a drawing and sketching teacher at the Tarnopolska Art Factory of the Ukrainian Artists' Union.

From 1970 he lived in Ternopil.

Improvements 
He created monumental easel sculpture, using various materials: marble, granite, sandstone, bronze, artificial stone.

Author of about 50 monuments and over 180 easel sculptures, in particular:

monuments:
 soldiers-fishermen (1969, Temryuk, Russia),
 Hero of the Soviet Union O. Zhadova (1985, Ternopil),
 T. Shevchenko (1989, Verbovets village, Lanovets district; 1993, Yabluniv village; 1999, Tovste village; both – Husiatyn district),
 I. Blazhkevych (1989, Denisiv village, Koziv district),
 S. Charnetsky (1991, Shmankivtsi village, Chortkiv district),
 I. Franko (1992, village of Tsygany, Borshchiv district),
 D. Lukiyanovich (village of Gorodnytsia),
 scientist V. Simovych (both in 1993; the village of Hadynkivtsi; both in the Husiatyn district),
 P. Dumtsi (1999, Kupchyntsi village, Koziv district),
 to the 2000th anniversary of the Nativity of Christ (2000, Bila village, Ternopil district)
 Independence (2003, Monastyryska; 2006, Romanivka village, Pidvolochysk district),
 soldiers of the UPA "Protection" (2005, Sapova village, Koziv district),
 To the Fighters for the Freedom of Ukraine (2006, Vasylkivtsi village), Bishop H. Khomyshyn (2008, Hadynkivtsi village; both – Husiatyn district),
 "Vitta – the goddess of life" (2009, Anapa, Krasnodar Territory);

series of portraits:
 "Ternopil" (1970–1990);

busts:
 A. Yelchaninov (1980),
 Hero of Socialist Labor A. Karpenko (1987),
 T. Shevchenko (1989, Horodyshche village, Zboriv district; all – Ternopil region);

compositions:
 "Labor exalted" (1988);

memorial plaques:
 S. Dnistryansky (1991),
 V. Stefanyk, O. Vitoshynsky (both – 1992; all – Ternopil);

emblem:
 "Science" (Chortkiv Institute of Entrepreneurship and Business, Ternopil region, 2004).

References

Sources 
 Мулярчук Іван Матвійович // Енциклопедія сучасної України.
 Дуда І., Удіна Т. Мулярчук Іван Матвійович // Тернопільський енциклопедичний словник : у 4 т. / редкол.: Г. Яворський та ін., Тернопіль: Видавничо-поліграфічний комбінат «Збруч», 2005, Т. 2: К – О, s. 578–579, ISBN 966-528-199-2.
 Мулярчук Іван Матвійович // Мистці Тернопільщини. Частина 1. Образотворче мистецтво: бібліографічний покажчик / департамент культури, релігій та національностей Тернопільської облдержадміністарації, Тернопільська обласна університецька наукова бібліотека; укладач Миськів В.; вступна стаття І. Дуда; керівник проєкту та науковий редактор Вітенко В.; редактор Жовтко Г., Тернопіль: Підручники і посібники, 2015, s. 358–360, ISBN 978-966-07-2936-0.

1930 births
2020 deaths
Ukrainian sculptors
People from Rivne Oblast